Mont-Albert is an unorganized territory in the Gaspésie–Îles-de-la-Madeleine region of Quebec, Canada.

It was established circa 1940 as a forestry centre and named after the nearby Cap-Seize Creek, a tributary of the Sainte-Anne River. While the name literally means "Cape Sixteen", it is actually a transformation of the English word "capsize", the creek's original name. A post office operated there from 1946 to 1969.

It was formed in 1932 as part of the Vautrin Settlement Plan to encourage colonization of Gaspésie's interior and intended to bring relief during the Great Depression of the 1930s. The settlement was named after founding priest Louis-Octave Caron (1879–1942) and a hopeful outlook of the future (avenir is French for "future"). It grew to 1200 residents in 1937 but then declined until it was abandoned in 1971. Only summer camps remain.

The territory is home to the Chic-Choc Wildlife Reserve and Gaspésie National Park where the eponymous Mount Albert and Mont Jacques-Cartier are located. Mount Albert, with a  peak, is the 9th highest peak in Quebec. It was named in honour of Prince Albert of Saxe-Coburg and Gotha because geologist Alexander Murray made the first recorded ascent of the mountain on the Prince's birthday, 26 August 1845.

Both mountains are popular with hikers (the International Appalachian Trail traverses them both) and share a unique ecology for its latitude: snow cover for 9 months of the year and alpine tundra vegetation. Furthermore, the territory is also home to migratory woodland caribou, the only remaining herd south of the Saint Lawrence.

Demographics

Notable people
 Thérèse Dion (1927–2020), television personality and the mother of singer Céline Dion

Gallery

See also
 List of unorganized territories in Quebec

References

Unorganized territories in Gaspésie-Îles-de-la-Madeleine